Carlos Alejandro Alfaro Moreno (born 18 October 1964 in Buenos Aires) is an Argentine former footballer who played as a striker. He played club football in Argentina, Spain, Ecuador and Mexico as well as representing the Argentina national football team.

Club career
Alfaro Moreno started his career in 1983 with Club Atlético Platense, in 1988 he moved to Club Atlético Independiente where he played an important part in their championship winning campaign in 1988–89. He was awarded the 1989 Player of the Year of Argentina.

In 1991 Alfaro Moreno moved to Spain to play for Espanyol his time with the club was unsuccessful and he moved to Palamós also of Spain.

In 1993, he returned to Independiente, before moving on to join Barcelona Sporting Club in Ecuador. Alfaro Moreno helped the club to win the Ecuadorian championship in 1995 and in 1997. Part way through the 1997 season Alfaro Moreno was sold to Mexican team Club América, he then had a spell with Atlante before returning to Barcelona.

In 2000 Alfaro Moreno returned to Argentina to play for Ferro Carril Oeste but he only stayed for the Apertura 2000 tournament before returning to Barcelona for a third spell with the club before his retirement in 2002.

International career
Between 1989 and 1991 Alfaro Moreno played 11 games for the Argentina national football team scoring 2 goals.

After football
After retirement Alfaro Moreno has gone into coaching and youth development, running his own soccer school in Guayaquil called the Academia de Fútbol Alfaro Moreno.

Honours
 Independiente
Primera División Argentina: 1988–89

 Barcelona Sporting Club
Ecuadorian championship: 1995, 1997

External links
http://www.alfaromoreno.com/

References

1964 births
Living people
Footballers from Buenos Aires
Argentine footballers
Argentina international footballers
1989 Copa América players
Association football forwards
Club Atlético Platense footballers
Club Atlético Independiente footballers
Barcelona S.C. footballers
RCD Espanyol footballers
Palamós CF footballers
Atlante F.C. footballers
Club América footballers
Ferro Carril Oeste footballers
Expatriate footballers in Mexico
Expatriate footballers in Spain
Expatriate footballers in Ecuador
Footballers at the 1988 Summer Olympics
Olympic footballers of Argentina
Barcelona S.C. managers
Argentine Primera División players
Argentine expatriate footballers
Argentine expatriate sportspeople in Mexico
Argentine expatriate sportspeople in Spain
Argentine football managers